Walpola Rahula Thero (1907–1997) was a Sri Lankan Buddhist monk, scholar and writer. In 1964, he became the Professor of History and Religions at Northwestern University, thus becoming the first bhikkhu to hold a professorial chair in the Western world. He also once held the position of Vice-Chancellor at the then Vidyodaya University (currently known as the University of Sri Jayewardenepura). He has written extensively about Buddhism in English, French and Sinhala. He wrote the book What the Buddha Taught about Theravada Buddhism.

Biography
He was born in 1907 at Walpola, a tiny village in southern Sri Lanka. At thirteen, he entered the Sangha. His education covered Sinhala, Pali, Sanskrit, Buddhism, history and philosophy. He studied at the Vidyalankara Pirivena and at the University of Ceylon, where he associated with E. F. C. Ludowyk, G.P Malalasekera, E. W. Adikaram and other scholars. After his period at the Sorbonne, he became Vice-Chancellor of Vidyodaya University. He was noted not only for his erudition but also for his strong socialist views, as well as his belief that monks have a duty to play a role in guiding the political consciousness of the people. His book Bhikshuvakage Urumaya (Heritage of the Bhikkhu) was a strong voice in the Buddhist Nationalist movement that led to the 1956 electoral victory of Solomon Bandaranaike. He left Vidyodaya University in 1969, due to political differences with the government of the day. Thereafter, he returned to the West and worked in many academic institutions in Europe. He returned to Sri Lanka during his last days, and lived in the temple near the New Parliament in Kotte, until his death.

Academic career
Rahula Thero attended Ceylon university (now known as the University of Peradeniya). He obtained a B.A. Honours degree (London), and then earned a Doctorate of Philosophy, having written a thesis on the History of Buddhism in Sri Lanka (Ceylon). Then he went on to study Indian Philosophy at Calcutta University and later studied Mahayana at the Sorbonne. It was during his time at the Sorbonne in the late 1950s that he produced What the Buddha Taught, a widely read and highly influential  introductory text on Buddhism, for which he is best known.

Walpola Rahula Thero is the first Buddhist monk to become a professor in a Western University. When he became Professor of History and Literature of Religions there were no Theravada Temples in the United States. He later became a Professor Emeritus at the same university. Rahula also held positions at several other American Universities. He was a visiting lecturer at Swarthmore College and Regents Lecturer at UCLA. He became Vice-Chancellor of Vidyoda University (now Sri Jayawardhanapura University) in 1964. He was later instrumental in encouraging the formation of the first Theravada temple in the United States, the Washington Buddhist Vihara, located in Washington, D.C.

Titles
Rahula Thero was awarded several titles during his lifetime. The highest honorary title, Tripitakavagisvaracarya (Supreme Master of Buddhist Scriptures), was given him by Sri Kalyapi Samagri Sangha-sabha (the Chapter of the Sangha in Sri Lanka) in 1965, with the qualification Sri (Gracious), a title held by only two or three scholars in Sri Lanka. He was also awarded the title "Aggamaha Panditha" from Burma.

Publications
Rahula Thero wrote extensively about Theravada Buddhism. Apart from his world-renowned book What the Buddha Taught, he published an enormous number of papers on Buddhism. Notable books written by him include, History of Buddhism in Ceylon, Heritage of the Bhikkhu, Zen and the Taming of the Bull and Le Compendium de la Super Doctrine (French).

Bibliography
 What The Buddha Taught (1959)
 History of Buddhism in Ceylon: The Anuradhapura period, 3rd Century BC – 10th Century AD (1966)
 Humour in Pali Literature and Other Essays (1997)
 The Heritage of the Bhikkhu: A Short History of the Bhikkhu in Educational, Cultural, Social, and Political Life (1974)
 Heritage of Bhikkhu (1974)
 Zen and the Taming of the Bull: Towards the Definition of Buddhist Thought: Essays (1978)
 The Heritage of the Bhikkhu: The Buddhist Tradition of Service (2003)

See also
 "Basic Points Unifying the Theravāda and the Mahāyāna" (1967/1981), developed by Ven. Rahula

References

Sources

External links
What the Buddha Taught
Venerable Walpola Rahula: A brief biographical sketch by Udaya Mallawarachchi. From the book Buddhist Studies in Honour of Walpola Rahula, 1980, 
 Amara Samara in Sinhala.

1907 births
1997 deaths
University of Paris alumni
Sri Lankan scholars of Buddhism
Theravada Buddhism writers
Sri Lankan Buddhist monks
Sri Lankan Theravada Buddhists
Theravada Buddhist spiritual teachers
University of Calcutta alumni
Academic staff of the University of Sri Jayewardenepura
20th-century Buddhist monks
Sri Lankan recipients of Agga Maha Pandita